Sam Keevers is an Australian jazz pianist. Together with Jamie Oehlers he was nominated for ARIA Award for Best Jazz Album in 2005 for Grace.

Keevers has been a member of Vince Jones band, Los Cabrones (Latin Jazz big band) and Red Fish Blue.

Discography

Albums

Awards and nominations

ARIA Music Awards
The ARIA Music Awards is an annual awards ceremony that recognises excellence, innovation, and achievement across all genres of Australian music. They commenced in 1987. 

! 
|-
| 2005
| Grace (with Jamie Oehlers)
| Best Jazz Album
| 
| 
|-

References

External links
Sam Keevers | Keynetic Records

Australian musicians
Living people
Year of birth missing (living people)